The Butler House is a turreted, brick house built in 1892 for prominent St. Louis tobacco manufacturer James Gay Butler.  It was designed in the Queen Anne style by Albert Knell, a Canadian architect.

James Gay Buter
James Gay Butler (January 23, 1840–August 22, 1916) was an American tobacco executive. He was a major supporter of Lindenwood University. Butler is buried at Bellefontaine Cemetery in St. Louis, Missouri.

References

Queen Anne architecture in Missouri
Houses on the National Register of Historic Places in Missouri
Houses in St. Louis
Houses completed in 1892
National Register of Historic Places in St. Louis